The Topato Corporation (styled as TopatoCo) is a widely recognized online retailer of webcomics and related merchandise. It was established around 2004 by artist Jeffrey Rowland.

History 

The company was started in Oklahoma in "about 2004" by artist Jeffrey Rowland after he lost his job in 2004, to help sell shirts, stickers and other merchandise linked to his webcomics. When the 2004 presidential election was won by George W. Bush, Rowland designed a satirical T-shirt and sold 1000 of them in one month.

Rowland later expanded the business to ship products ordered from friends' websites, who in 2007 moved their retailing to TopatoCo. As a result of the expansion, the company later moved to Easthampton, Massachusetts. In a 2009 interview, Rowland stated that he considered the business to be "mundane" in comparison with the creative development of comics, often interfering with the time he wanted to spend doing comics.

The company has been described as "perhaps the largest and most recognizable E-tailer of webcomic merchandise" by Caleb Goellner in ComicsAlliance and takes its name from the Topato Potato character in Rowland's Wigu Adventures. Rowland has described the company's business philosophy as being "give digital stuff away for free, sell real stuff".

In 2013, the company started Make That Thing, a Kickstarter fulfillment service.

Clients 

Some cartoonists involved from the early days of the company are Jonathan Rosenberg, Richard Stevens, John Allison and Meredith Gran. In a 2008 interview, Rowland stated that the "big guys" in terms of clients were Dinosaur Comics and Dr. McNinja. Other clients include Questionable Content  and MS Paint Adventures. The company found in 2009 that it was growing too quickly, and reluctantly turned down some potential clients.

References

External links 
 

Webcomic publishing companies
Massachusetts culture
Retail companies based in Massachusetts
Retail companies established in 2004
American companies established in 2004
2004 establishments in Oklahoma